The Milan Biennial III was the third edition of the Monza Biennial. This, and the other 3 biennials, were organised by the Istituto Superiore per le Industrie Artistiche (ISIA) to provide an arts vision for the new Kingdom of Italy. It was called the International Exhibition of Decorative Arts.

It was held in Monza at the Royal Villa of Monza, and ran from 19 May 1923 to 20 October 1923.

After 4 biennials the timing was changed to every three years to form the Milan Triennials.

References 

1925 in Italy
Monza
World's fairs in Italy